Oliver Martin Schriver (December 17, 1879 – June 28, 1947) was an American gunnery sergeant, sport shooter, and Olympic champion.

He won three gold medals at the 1920 Summer Olympics in Antwerp.

He was born in Washington, D. C., and also died there.

References

1879 births
1947 deaths
American male sport shooters
United States Distinguished Marksman
ISSF rifle shooters
Shooters at the 1920 Summer Olympics
Olympic gold medalists for the United States in shooting
Olympic medalists in shooting
Medalists at the 1920 Summer Olympics